Stanija Dobrojević (born 17 March 1985) is aSerbian glamour model, reality television personality and former recording artist. Born in Virovitica and raised in Ruma, she rose to prominence as a contestant on Survivor Srbija VIP: Costa Rica in 2012. Stanija later won the sixth season of the reality show Farma (2015) with 57,6% of the public votes, receiving the main prize of €50,000.

Recognized as a sex symbol, she has been featured in numerous magazines, such as Maxim, FHM and Playboy. She also attended the Playboy Mansion as a playmate. 

In 2015, Dobrojević graduated from the University of Novi Sad with a bachelor's degree in economics. 

She moved in a penthouse apartment in Ruma during 2022. Stanija resides between Serbia and Ocean City, New Jersey.

Filmography

Discography
Singles
 Glavni akter (2016)
 Na kraju balade (2016); feat. Marko Vanilla
 Sveta Marija (2017)
 Šta te to loži (2017); feat. MC Damiro

See also
List of glamour models

References

External links

1985 births
People from Virovitica
People from Ruma
Serbs of Croatia
Croatian emigrants to Serbia
Living people
Reality television participants
Reality show winners
Serbian television personalities
Serbian female models
Yugoslav Wars refugees